Sredgora (Gottschee German: Mittnbold) is a settlement in the Municipality of Semič in Slovenia. The area is part of the historical region of Lower Carniola. The municipality is now included in the Southeast Slovenia Statistical Region.

Name

The name Sredgora is a fused prepositional phrase that has lost case inflection, from sredi 'in the middle of' + gora 'forest'. In Slovene and Slavic in general, the common noun gora refers not only to a mountain, but also to a forest in a hilly or mountainous area. The German name of the village, Mittenwald, semantically corresponds to the Slovene name and is a compound of mitten 'in the middle of' + Wald 'forest'.

History
The village was inhabited by Gottschee Germans that were expelled in 1941 during the Second World War and was burned to the ground in 1944. The local church, now a ruin, was dedicated to Mary Magdalene and belonged to the Parish of Planina.

References

External links

Sredgora at Geopedia
Pre–World War II list of oeconyms and family names in Sredgora

Populated places in the Municipality of Semič